Warren Samuel Eaton (June 12, 1891 – June 22, 1966) was a pioneer aviator.

Biography
He was born on June 12, 1891 in South Dakota and moved to Los Angeles, California with his parents. He died on June 22, 1966 and was buried in the Portal of Folded Wings Shrine to Aviation.

References

Burials at Valhalla Memorial Park Cemetery
Members of the Early Birds of Aviation
1891 births
1966 deaths
People from South Dakota
People from Los Angeles
Place of birth missing
Place of death missing